His Father's Son is a 1917 silent film drama directed by George D. Baker and starring Lionel Barrymore. It was produced and distributed by Metro Pictures.

Cast
Lionel Barrymore - J. Dabney Barron
Irene Howley - Betty Arden
Frank Currier - John Arden
Charles Eldridge - Adam Barron
George A. Wright - Perkins
Phil Sanford - Jim Foley
Walter Horton - Lord Lawrence
Hugh Jeffrey -
Florence Natol -
Ilean Hume - 
Marien Dennis -

Preservation status
A print exists in Archives Du Film Du CNC, Bois d'Arcy.

See also
Lionel Barrymore filmography

References

External links

1917 films
American silent feature films
Films directed by George D. Baker
American black-and-white films
Silent American drama films
1917 drama films
Metro Pictures films
1910s American films